The 1980 Lorraine Open was a men's tennis tournament played on indoor carpet courts. The event was part of the 1980 Volvo Grand Prix and was played in Nancy in France. It was the second edition of the tournament and was held from 17 March through 23 March 1980. First-seeded Gene Mayer won the singles title.

Finals

Singles
 Gene Mayer defeated  Gianni Ocleppo 6–3, 6–3, 6–0
 It was Mayer's 2nd singles title of the year and the 4th of his career.

Doubles
 Colin Dibley /  Gene Mayer defeated  Chris Delaney /  Kim Warwick 7–6, 7–5

References

External links
 ITF tournament edition details

Lorraine Open
Lorraine Open
Lorraine Open
Lorraine Open